Spencer Eakin Farm, also known as Springhill Farm, is a farm in Shelbyville, Tennessee listed on the National Register of Historic Places in 1993.  It is also a Century Farm, meaning that it has been owned by the same family for over 100 years.

History
Spencer Eakin Farm was founded by the Eakin family in 1842. The farm contains 6 buildings and one structure in classical revival, Queen Anne, and American movement styles of architecture.

Modern day
Spencer Eakin Farm is still privately owned by the Eakin family. In 2014, it received the Century Farm designation, marking it as a farm owned by the same family for 100 consecutive years.

References

Buildings and structures in Shelbyville, Tennessee
Houses completed in 1903
Farms on the National Register of Historic Places in Tennessee
Houses on the National Register of Historic Places in Tennessee
National Register of Historic Places in Bedford County, Tennessee
1842 establishments in Tennessee
Century farms
Queen Anne architecture in Tennessee
Neoclassical architecture in Tennessee